Jeong Se-woon (born May 31, 1997) is a South Korean singer-songwriter signed under Starship Entertainment.

Career

2013–2017: Pre-debut
Jeong's first public appearance was in 2013, as a contestant in the third season of K-pop Star. He passed the first round of auditions with a performance of his original song titled "Mom, Wait a Minute". One of the judges in the show, founder and former JYP Entertainment CEO Park Jin-young, praised the musical form of the song and likened him to Akdong Musician, who were the winners of the second season of K-pop Star. Starting from the third round, he competed as part of the duo Something with fellow contestant Kim Ah-hyeon. The duo reached the finals but was eliminated during the first round of live performances. In July 2014, three months after the show concluded, Jeong signed a contract with Starship Entertainment.

In 2017, he represented Starship Entertainment in Produce 101 Season 2 alongside fellow trainee Lee Gwang-hyun. He became part of the Top 20 but was eliminated during the finale, after ranking 12th overall with 769,859 votes. After the show, on August 1, it was reported that he had started preparing for his solo debut.

2017–2019: Debut and commercial solo success

Jeong debuted as a solo artist on August 31, with his first EP titled Ever, which peaked at number two on the Gaon Album Chart after selling 23,438 copies within its first week. The EP contain six songs, including his original compositions "Miracle" and "Never Mind", as well as the title track "Just U", featuring rapper Sik-K. "Just U" peaked at number eight and had more than 59,790 digital downloads within the first week of sales.

His second EP, After was released in January 2018. The title track of the album was "Baby It's U" and the album contained the self-produced track "Close Over". Jeong also held his first concert Ever: After in 2018.

In 2019, Jeong became a radio DJ for EBS Radio's "Listen".

2020–present: 24 and Where Is My Garden!
On June 23, it was confirmed that Jeong would make his summer comeback with his first studio album 24 Part. 1 on July 14. Jeong participated in the writing and production of the album, with the album showing musical growth while still retaining Jeong's musical style.

On December 16, it was announced that Jeong would return with the second part of his studio album 24 Part. 2 on January 6, 2021. 24 Part. 2 has been described as "a more melancholy, rock-pop sound" than his previous EP.

In March 2022, Jeong will publish his first article 'Honorable Words' on April 6, 2022.

On April 25, 2022, Starship Entertainment announced that Jeong would be making a comeback with his fifth EP, Where Is My Garden! on May 11.

On July 13, 2022, it was announced that Jeong his solo concert 2022 Jeong Se-woon Concert Our Garden on August 27 and 28 at the Blue Square Mastercard Hall in Yongsan-gu, Seoul, and it will be the concert in three years.

On September 29, 2022, it was announced that Jeong would have a fan meeting on October 29.

Discography

Studio albums

Extended plays

Singles

Soundtrack appearances

Collaborations 

Other charted songs

Filmography

Television shows

Web shows

Radio shows

Music videos

Theater

Concerts and tours 
 Ever After (2018)
 Zero (2019)
 Our Garden (2022)
 The Wave (2023)

Awards and nominations

Notes

References

External links

1997 births
Living people
Starship Entertainment artists
K-pop singers
South Korean pop singers
South Korean contemporary R&B singers
South Korean pop guitarists
South Korean rhythm and blues guitarists
South Korean male idols
K-pop Star participants
Produce 101 contestants
21st-century South Korean  male singers
21st-century guitarists